Nadifloxacin (INN, brand names Acuatim, Nadiflox, Nadoxin, Nadixa, Activon) is a topical fluoroquinolone antibiotic for the treatment of acne vulgaris.  It is also used to treat bacterial skin infections.

Pharmacology

Antibacterial spectrum
In vitro studies of nadifloxacin showed potent and broad-spectrum antibacterial activity against aerobic Gram-positive, Gram-negative and anaerobic bacteria, including Cutibacterium acnes and Staphylococcus epidermidis. Nadifloxacinshowed potent antibacterial activity against methicillin-resistant Staphylococcus aureus (MRSA), which was similar to potency against methicillin-sensitive Staphylococcus aureus (MSSA). The drug was also active against new quinolone-resistant MRSA. Nadifloxacin does not show cross-resistance with other new fluoroquinolones.

Mechanism of action
Nadifloxacin inhibits the enzyme DNA gyrase that is involved in bacterial DNA synthesis and replication, thus inhibiting the bacterial multiplication.
Nadifloxacin in addition to determine a therapeutic antibacterial action, can have a sebostatic and anti-inflammatory action, thus contributing to the improvement of the clinical condition of the patient.

Pharmacokinetics
Following  a single topical application of 10 g nadifloxacin 1% cream to normal human back skin, the highest plasma concentration was determined to be 107 ng/mL with an elimination half-life of 19.4 hours. Approximately 0.09% of the administered dose was excreted in the urine over 48 hours post- dosing. The plasma concentration reached a steady state on Day 5 of repeated administration study when nadifloxacin 1% cream was applied at 5 g twice daily to normal healthy individuals for a period of 7 days. The plasma concentration reached a peak of 4.1 ng/ml at 8 hours post-final dosing with an elimination half-life of 23.2 hours. The urinary excretion rate reached 0.16% on Day 7.

Clinical use 
In some European countries, the drug has been approved  for the treatment of acne vulgaris. In a 2013 multicenter, randomized clinical study with a total of 184 Japanese patients with moderate to severe acne, adapalene 0.1% gel plus nadifloxacin 1% cream (combination therapy) showed a significant efficacy in decrement of inflammatory papulopustular lesions.
In patients with skin lesions, topical application of nadifloxacin can result in plasma concentrations of 1 to 3 ng/ml. Consequently, some authors argued that it should not be used to treat relatively harmless diseases like acne vulgaris, risking the development of quinolone resistances.

Adverse effects 
During the treatment some patients may develop some adverse effects predominantly of the skin and subcutaneous tissue: burning and itching (in absolute the most common side effect), contact dermatitis, dryness and skin irritation.

References

Flumequines
4-Hydroxypiperidines